The 2003 ASEAN Para Games, officially known as the 2nd ASEAN Para Games, was a Southeast Asian disabled multi-sport event held eight days after the 2003 Southeast Asian Games in Hanoi, Vietnam from 21 to 27 December 2003. This was the first time and so far only time Vietnam hosted the ASEAN Para Games and the first time East Timor participated at the ASEAN Para Games.

Vietnam is the second country to host the ASEAN Para Games after Malaysia. Around 740 athletes from 11 participating nations participated at the games, which featured 287 events in 5 sports. The games was opened by Pham Gia Khiem, the Deputy Prime Minister of Vietnam at the My Dinh National Stadium.

The final medal tally was led by Thailand, followed by host Vietnam and Malaysia.

Development and preparation
The 2nd ASEAN Para Games Organising Committee was formed to oversee the staging of the games.

Venues
The 2nd ASEAN Para Games had 5 venues for the games.

Marketing

Logo

The emblem of the 2nd ASEAN Para Games is a stylised image of a wheelchair athlete with two hands raised up upwards in the shape of a "V" which symbolises Vietnam and victory. At the top of the emblem, 11 small circles linked together around the image of "Khue Van Cac" (room for reciting poems). The linked small circles represents solidarity, cooperation, and friendship of disabled athletes among 11 countries in the Southeast Asian region, while the Khue Van Cac represents the host country Vietnam. The colours of the athlete and the Khue Van Cac are dark sea blue which represents unity while the colours of the 11 circles are vermilion which represents courage and passion.

Mascot
The mascot of the 2003 ASEAN Para Games is "The Golden Goat" which was designed by Nguyen The Nguyen. It was selected by the Organising Committee because the year 2003, year of which Vietnam hosting the second ASEAN Para Games is a goat year in most lunar calendars, especially in Vietnamese and Chinese calendar. The goat is widely described in many art and literary works of Vietnam as a very intimate, friendly and useful animal to the people in daily life. The Golden Goat symbolises happiness, victory and courage when facing challenges. The mascot's design of wearing the sports costume, holds its left hand on its waist, and raises the right hand upwards with two fingers stretching out in a "V" shape represents the strong belief in fair-play among athletes to reach the highest achievements at the games.

Songs
The theme song of the 2003 ASEAN Para Games is "Welcome to Para Games-Hanoi".

The games

Opening ceremony
The opening ceremony was held at the My Dinh National Stadium on 21 December 2005 at 19:00 (VST - UTC+7).

Closing ceremony
The closing ceremony was held at the Hanoi Sports Palace on 27 December 2005 at 19:00 (VST).

Participating nations

Sports
5 Sports are introduced for the 2003 ASEAN Para Games with 4 of them are Paralympics events. 
  Athletics 
  Badminton
  Powerlifting
  Swimming 
  Table tennis

Medal table
A total of 760 medals comprising 287 gold medals, 245 silver medals and 228 bronze medals were awarded to athletes. The Host Vietnam's performance was its best ever yet in ASEAN Para Games History and was second behind Thailand as overall champion.

Key
 Host nation (Vietnam)

See also
2003 Southeast Asian Games

References

External links
 2003 ASEAN Para Games official website  Retrieved Using Wayback Machine
 International Games

ASEAN Para Games
Sport in Hanoi
2003 in Vietnamese sport
2003 in Asian sport
2003 in multi-sport events
Multi-sport events in Vietnam
21st century in Hanoi